Odd Henning Grønmo (born 15 March 1922 - 29 April 2012) was a Norwegian politician for the Christian Democratic Party.

He was born in Brønnøy, but spent his professional career at Bodø Teacher's College from 1951 to 1989. He was a member of Bodin municipal council from 1956 to 1963, serving as deputy mayor from 1956 to 1959 and mayor from 1960 to 1963. From 1960 to 1983 he was a member of Nordland county council, serving as county mayor from 1976 to 1983.

He was also a supervisory council member of the Bank of Norway for twelve years. He resided in Bodø.

References

1922 births
2012 deaths
People from Brønnøy
People from Bodø
Christian Democratic Party (Norway) politicians
Mayors of places in Nordland
Chairmen of County Councils of Norway
Academic staff of the University of Nordland